Bhoojo to Jeeto (Urdu: بھوجو تو جیتو) is an Urdu comedy television game show hosted by Aleena Lodhi Haroon that airs at 7:00-8:00 p.m. Thursday through Sunday on Lahore News HD.

Bhoojo to Jeeto is a game show in which the host visits places in Lahore. Participants selected by the host win prizes by answering questions. The participants are allowed to share recipes, jokes, poems and songs.

Cast 
 Aleena Haroon Lodhi

Special episodes 

 Lahore Zoo Episodes 
 Shahi Qila Episodes 
 Liberty Market Episodes
 Minar e Pakistan Episodes
 Punjab University Episodes
 Race Course Park
 Amanah Mall

Awards 

 Best Show of the Year Award from Lahore News HD
 Achievement Award For Coverage & Participation in the Fun Rang & Rang Event Painting Exhibition at the Alhamra Art Gallery

Segments of the show 
Segment No. 1: The host ask questions of the participating individuals or families.

Segment No. 2: The host awards prizes or "gifts" to all participants.

Segment No. 3: The host gives closing sentiments and invites viewers to participate in future episodes.

References

External links 
 Bhoojo to Jeeto show on YouTube
 

Urdu-language television shows
2010 Pakistani television series debuts
Pakistani comedy television series